Forex is the foreign exchange market, the global international currency market

Forex or FOREX can also be used for

Finance
 The forex scandal
 Forex Bank, a Swedish company
 A foreign exchange swap

Other
 FC Forex Brașov, a Romanian football team
 A company used in an FBI sting operation